Sangan-e Bala Khvaf (also Romanized as Sangān-e Bālā Khvāf; also known as Sangān, Sangūn, and Sāngūn-e Bālā) is a village in Astaneh Rural District, in the Central District of Roshtkhar County, Razavi Khorasan Province, Iran. At the 2006 census, its population was 2,062, in 556 families.

References 

Populated places in Roshtkhar County